Kumar Deobrat Singh (born 24 October 1992) is an Indian cricketer who plays for Jharkhand cricket team. Deobrat is a right-handed batsman. In January 2015, Deobrat became the captain of Jharkhand for all forms of the game, replacing Saurabh Tiwary at the position. Deobrat has represented Jharkhand at different age-group levels such as Under-16, Under-19, Under-22 and Under-25. During the 2011/12 season, he was a member of the India Under-19 cricket team. In September 2011, he was named the vice-captain of the India Under-19 team. He has been a member of East Zone cricket team since the 2013/14 season.

He was the leading run-scorer for Jharkhand in the 2018–19 Ranji Trophy, with 631 runs in seven matches.

References

External links 
 

1992 births
Living people
Indian cricketers
Jharkhand cricketers
East Zone cricketers
People from Bokaro Steel City